Østrup is a surname. Notable people with the surname include:

 Ernst Østrup (1845–1917), Danish botanist and phycologist, mainly working on diatoms
 Johannes Østrup (1867–1938), Danish philologist and professor
 Lauritz Christian Østrup (1881–1940), Danish fencer